The women's 1500 metres event at the 1986 World Junior Championships in Athletics was held in Athens, Greece, at Olympic Stadium on 19 and 20 July.

Medalists

Results

Final
20 July

Heats
19 July

Heat 1

Heat 2

Heat 3

Participation
According to an unofficial count, 35 athletes from 28 countries participated in the event.

References

1500 metres
1500 metres at the World Athletics U20 Championships